More of Tom Lehrer was the second studio album recorded by musical satirist Tom Lehrer. The LP contains the same songs (in the same sequence) as the live album An Evening Wasted with Tom Lehrer, which was recorded and released earlier in the same year. The album was recorded and mixed in a single three-hour session at the RCA Studios in New York on July 8, 1959.

When Reprise Records took over the distribution of Lehrer's works in the 1960s, they chose to represent Lehrer's 1959 material with the live versions of An Evening Wasted, and as a consequence More of... remained out of print for several decades. It was eventually reissued by Rhino Records as part of the 1997 album  Songs & More Songs by Tom Lehrer and in the 2000 box set The Remains of Tom Lehrer. Although More of... was originally released in monophonic and stereo versions, the producers of the Rhino releases opted for the mono mix.

Track listing
Side 1
"Poisoning Pigeons in the Park"
"Bright College Days" 
"A Christmas Carol"
"The Elements" (music by Arthur Sullivan)
"Oedipus Rex"
"In Old Mexico"

Side 2
"Clementine"
"It Makes a Fellow Proud to Be a Soldier"
"She's My Girl"
"The Masochism Tango"
"We Will All Go Together When We Go"

References

1959 albums
Tom Lehrer albums
1950s comedy albums
Self-released albums